This is a list of the flora of Queensland listed as Vulnerable under the Nature Conservation Act 1992.

 Acacia ammophila
 Acacia attenuata
 Acacia barakulensis
 Acacia baueri subsp. baueri
 Acacia chinchillensis
 Acacia crombiei
 Acacia curranii
 Acacia deuteroneura
 Acacia eremophiloides
 Acacia guymeri
 Acacia handonis
 Acacia lauta
 Acacia perangusta
 Acacia peuce waddy
 Acacia pubifolia
 Acacia purpureopetala
 Acacia ruppii
 Acacia solenota
 Acacia sp. (Gwambagwine F.Carter 2)
 Acacia tingoorensis
 Acacia wardellii
 Acalypha lyonsii
 Acriopsis javanica
 Actephila foetida
 Actephila sp. (Koumala I.G.Champion 870)
 Allocasuarina rigida subsp. exsul
 Alloxylon flammeum
 Amorphospermum whitei
 Archidendron lovelliae
 Arenga australasica
 Aristida annua
 Arthraxon hispidus
 Asplenium pellucidum
 Asplenium unilaterale
 Asplenium wildii
 Babingtonia squarrulosa
 Babingtonia tozerensis
 Baeckea trapeza
 Baloghia marmorata
 Banksia conferta subsp. conferta
 Bertya pinifolia
 Bertya sp. (Mt Ernest G.Leiper AQ507685)
 Bertya sp. (Winneba D.Jermyn 31)
 Boronia keysii
 Boronia sp. (Aranbanga Creek P.Grimshaw+ PG2597)
 Bothriochloa bunyensis
 Bulbophyllum gracillimum
 Bulbophyllum longiflorum
 Bulbophyllum weinthalii
 Bursaria reevesii
 Cadellia pentastylis
 Calamus warburgii
 Callistemon pungens
 Callistemon sp. (Boulia L.Pedley 5297)
 Calophyllum bicolor
 Calytrix gurulmundensis
 Canarium acutifolium var. acutifolium
 Canthium costatum
 Canthium sp. (Thursday Island E.Cowley 10)
 Capparis thozetiana
 Carmona retusa
 Caustis blakei subsp. macrantha
 Chamaesyce carissoides
 Chiloglottis sphyrnoides
 Cissus aristata
 Citrus inodora
 Clematis fawcettii
 Cliffordiochloa parvispicula
 Comesperma oblongatum
 Commersonia sp. (Beeron P.I.Forster PIF4658)
 Coopernookia scabridiuscula
 Corybas montanus
 Corymbia clandestina
 Corymbia leptoloma
 Corymbia rhodops
 Corymbia xanthope
 Croton magneticus
 Cryptocarya foetida
 Ctenopteris blechnoides
 Ctenopteris walleri
 Cupaniopsis shirleyana
 Cupaniopsis tomentella
 Cycas cairnsiana
 Cycas desolata
 Cycas platyphylla
 Cycas semota
 Cycas silvestris
 Cycas tuckeri
 Cyperus clarus
 Cyperus semifertilis
 Daviesia discolor
 Daviesia quoquoversus
 Dendrobium bigibbum
 Dendrobium callitrophilum
 Dendrobium carronii
 Dendrobium johannis
 Dendrobium phalaenopsis
 Dendrobium x superbiens
 Denhamia parvifolia
 Dichanthium queenslandicum
 Dissiliaria tuckeri
 Dioclea hexandra
 Diplazium cordifolium
 Dischidia littoralis
 Dodonaea rupicola
 Drosera prolifera
 Drosera schizandra
 Drynaria x dumicola
 Dryopteris sparsa
 Dubouzetia saxatilis
 Ectrosia blakei
 Eleocharis retroflexa
 Endiandra hayesii
 Eremophila tetraptera
 Eucalyptus argophloia
 Eucalyptus beaniana
 Eucalyptus hallii
 Eucalyptus infera
 Eucalyptus kabiana
 Eucalyptus magnificata
 Eucalyptus paedoglauca
 Eucalyptus raveretiana
 Eucalyptus scoparia
 Eucalyptus taurina
 Eucalyptus virens
 Eucryphia wilkiei
 Euodia sp. (Oliver Creek L.J.Webb+ 10897)
 Floydia praealta
 Fontainea australis
 Fontainea rostrata
 Fontainea venosa
 Freycinetia marginata
 Freycinetia percostata
 Gardenia psidioides
 Gaultheria sp. (Mt Merino G.Leiper AQ502686)
 Germainia capitata
 Gonocarpus urceolatus
 Grammitis reinwardtii
 Grastidium tozerense
 Graptophyllum ilicifolium
 Grevillea glossadenia
 Grevillea hockingsii
 Grevillea hodgei
 Grevillea kennedyana
 Grevillea quadricauda
 Grevillea scortechinii
 Grevillea venusta
 Gulubia costata
 Hakea maconochieana
 Hakea trineura
 Haloragis exalata
 Hexaspora pubescens
 Hicksbeachia pinnatifolia
 Homoranthus decumbens
 Homoranthus montanus
 Homoranthus porteri
 Huperzia lockyeri
 Huperzia marsupiiformis
 Huperzia phlegmarioides
 Huperzia prolifera
 Hydrocharis dubia
 Indigofera oxyrachis
 Jedda multicaulis
 Lawrencia buchananensis
 Leionema ellipticum
 Leionema obtusifolium
 Lepiderema sp. (Topaz P.I.Forster+ PIF15478)
 Leptospermum venustum
 Lepturus sp. (Chillagoe M.Godwin C2576)
 Livistona drudei
 Livistona lanuginosa
 Logania diffusa
 Lychnothamnus barbatus
 Macadamia claudiensis
 Macadamia integrifolia
 Macadamia ternifolia
 Macadamia tetraphylla
 Macropteranthes montana
 Macrozamia conferta
 Macrozamia crassifolia
 Macrozamia fearnsidei
 Macrozamia machinii
 Macrozamia occidua
 Macrozamia parcifolia
 Marsdenia brevifolia
 Marsdenia coronata
 Marsdenia longiloba
 Marsdenia paludicola
 Marsdenia pumila
 Marsdenia rara
 Marsdenia straminea
 Maundia triglochinoides
 Medicosma elliptica
 Medicosma obovata
 Melaleuca kunzeoides
 Micromyrtus rotundifolia
 Micromyrtus vernicosa
 Myriophyllum coronatum
 Myrmecodia beccarii
 Neisosperma kilneri
 Neoroepera buxifolia
 Newcastelia velutina
 Notelaea lloydii
 Ochrosperma obovatum
 Omphalea celata
 Owenia cepiodora
 Ozothamnus eriocephalus
 Ozothamnus vagans
 Parsonsia bartlensis
 Parsonsia kroombitensis
 Parsonsia larcomensis
 Paspalidium grandispiculatum
 Paspalidium udum
 Persicaria elatior
 Phaius pictus
 Phebalium glandulosum subsp. eglandulosum
 Phebalium whitei
 Philotheca acrolopha
 Philotheca sporadica
 Picris evae
 Plectranthus amoenus
 Plectranthus gratus
 Plectranthus leiperi
 Pomaderris crassifolia
 Pomatocalpa marsupiale
 Prasophyllum wallum
 Prostanthera palustris
 Prostanthera sp. (Dunmore D.M.Gordon 8A)
 Prostanthera sp. (Mt Tozer L.J.Brass 19478)
 Pterostylis bicornis
 Pultenaea setulosa
 Pultenaea stuartiana
 Quassia bidwillii
 Quassia sp. (Kennedy River J.R.Clarkson 5645)
 Rhaphidospora bonneyana
 Rhinerrhiza moorei
 Ricinocarpos speciosus
 Romnalda strobilacea
 Sarcochilus hartmannii
 Sarcochilus hirticalcar
 Sarcochilus roseus
 Sclerolaena blakei
 Sclerolaena walkeri
 Solanum carduiforme
 Solanum dunalianum
 Solanum sp. (Dalby R.F.Kelsey 56)
 Sophora fraseri
 Sowerbaea subtilis
 Spathoglottis plicata
 Stemmacantha australis
 Stemona angusta
 Stylidium longissimum
 Swainsona murrayana
 Symplocos baeuerlenii
 Syzygium hodgkinsoniae
 Syzygium moorei
 Syzygium velarum
 Tephrosia leveillei
 Thelepogon australiensis
 Thelypteris confluens
 Thesium australe
 Tinospora tinosporoides
 Trichoglottis australiensis
 Trigonostemon inopinatus
 Triplarina nitchaga
 Trymalium minutiflorum
 Vanda hindsii
 Westringia parvifolia
 Westringia rupicola
 Wetria australiensis
 Wodyetia bifurcata
 Xanthostemon oppositifolius
 Xerothamnella parvifolia
 Zeuxine polygonoides
 Zieria aspalathoides var. ovata
 Zieria collina
 Zieria rimulosa

References
 http://www.legislation.qld.gov.au/LEGISLTN/SLS/2000/00SL354.pdf

 
Queensland Nature Conservation Act flora
Queensland Nature Conservation Act vulnerable flora
Vulnerable flora of Australia
Environment of Queensland
Vulnerable flora